Ne touchez pas à la reine (Hands Off the Queen) is an opéra comique in three acts by French composer Xavier Boisselot after a libretto by Eugène Scribe and Gustave Vaëz. It was first staged in Paris at the Opéra-Comique on 16 January 1847.

References

External links
Ne touche pas à la reine: opéra-comique en trois actes Text on Google Books
Ne touche pas à la reine: opéra-comique en trois actes Score on Archive.org

Operas
1847 operas
Libretti by Eugène Scribe
Opéras comiques
French-language operas